Papaver umbonatum is a species of flowering plant in the family Papaveraceae. It is referred to by the common name Semitic poppy. It is often confused and misidentified as Papaver rhoeas (corn poppy, common in Europe) even though it is classified as the rest of the subspecies, since they are very similar in form and appearance.

Papaver umbonatum blossoms in the spring from March to June and has red flower (Anemone coronaria is the first to blossom).

References

umbonatum
Flora of Israel
Flora of Lebanon
Flora of Palestine (region)
Plants described in 1849
Taxa named by Pierre Edmond Boissier